Sounds from True Stories, subtitled Music for Activities Freaks, is the soundtrack to David Byrne's 1986 film True Stories. It was initially released on vinyl and cassette, but was given a CD and 2xLP release in 2018.

The album is not a complete soundtrack recording, featuring only a couple of the vocal songs heard in the film, with the rest being instrumental music. Byrne's band Talking Heads released the album True Stories, which contained versions of the other songs in the film.

Track listing

"Glass Operator" is an orchestral rendition of "Dream Operator" featuring a glass harmonica; "City of Steel" is a steel guitar version of "City of Dreams", which, along with "Dream Operator", appears on Talking Heads' True Stories.

Personnel 

 David Byrne: Lead and Bass Guitar on 'Disco Hits!' and 'I Love Metal Buildings'

Additional Musicians

 Drums – Prairie Prince ('Disco Hits!' and 'I Love Metal Buildings'), Steve Mitchell ('Freeway Son' and 'Brownie's Theme'), Chris Frantz ('City Of Steel'), Steve Jordan Jr. ('Soy De Tejas')
 Bass Guitar – Rich Girard ('Freeway Son' and 'Brownie's Theme'), Tina Weymouth ('City of Steel'), Steve Jordan ('Soy De Tejas')
 Guitar – Steve Erquiaga ('Freeway Son' and 'Brownie's Theme'), Steve Jordan ('Soy De Tejas')
 Piano – Phil Aaberg ('Freeway Son' and 'Brownie's Theme'), Jerry Harrison ('City of Steel'), Charles Judge ('I Love Metal Buildings')
 Pedal Steel Guitar –  Joe Goldmark ('Freeway Son' and 'I Love Metal Buildings'), Tommy Morrell ('City Of Steel')
 Violin –  Dick Bright ('Freeway Son' and 'Glass Operator'), David Harrington and John Sherba ('Dinner Music')
 Percussion – Michael Spiro ('Freeway Son' and 'Disco Hits!')
 Cello – Joan Jeanrenaud ('Dinner Music'), Charles Judge ('Glass Operator')
 Harp – Marcella De Cray ('Dinner Music' and 'Love Theme From True Stories')
 Keyboards – Charles Judge ('Disco Hits!'), Michael McClain ('Soy De Tejas')
 Accordion – Carl Finch ('Buster's Theme'), Steve Jordan ('Soy De Tejas')
 Bassoon  – Greg Barber ('Road Song')
 Clarinet and Bass Clarinet – Jim Pukey ('Road Song')
 Flute, Piccolo Flute and Alto Flute – Charlie McCarthy ('Road Song')
 Oboe – Robin May ('Road Song')
 Viola  – Hank Dutt ('Dinner Music')
 Concertinas – Paul Groff ('Love Theme From True Stories')
 Pan Flutes – Fernando Torres ('Love Theme From True Stories')
 Glass Harmonica – Terry Hinely ('Glass Operator')

Technical

 Engineers – Jack Leahy (tracks 2-4, 8-9, 11, 15-16), Michael McClain (tracks 5-7, 10, 12, 14), Don Caldwell ('Cocktail Desperado') and David Rosenblad ('Buster's Theme')
 Assistant Engineers – Gary Clayton, Jeff Kliment, Mark Roule and Sam Lehmer
 Mastered by Roy Halee and Jack Skinner
 Mixed by Roy Halee

Artwork

 Art Direction – Concept Arts and Lucinda Cowell
 Design – David Byrne and Michael Hodgson
 Front Cover Photograph – Annie Liebowitz 
 Back Cover Photograph – David Byrne, Christina Patoski, Mark Lipson

References

Albums produced by David Byrne
David Byrne soundtracks
1986 soundtrack albums
Sire Records soundtracks
Musical film soundtracks
Comedy film soundtracks